Kurt Krüger (4 October 1920 – 19 January 2003) was a German international footballer.

References

1920 births
2003 deaths
Association football midfielders
German footballers
Germany international footballers
Fortuna Düsseldorf players